Pinjarra railway station is located on the South Western Railway in Western Australia. It is located at the town of Pinjarra.

History
Pinjarra station opened on 22 May 1893 as the interim terminus of the South Western Railway from Perth. On 22 August 1893, the line was extended to Bunbury.

In 1911, Pinjarra became a junction station with the opening of the Pinjarra to Narrogin railway. Today this line is operated as a heritage railway by the Hotham Valley Railway, with its depot opposite Pinjarra station. In 1986, the station building was destroyed in a fire. A new building was erected in 2007 and today houses the Pinjarra Visitor Centre.

The station is today used by Transwa's twice daily Australind service.

References

External links
Pinjarra Station History of Western Australian Railways & Stations gallery

Railway stations in Western Australia
Railway stations in Australia opened in 1893
South Western Railway, Western Australia
State Register of Heritage Places in the Shire of Murray